The Great Northwest Athletic Conference women's basketball tournament is the annual women's basketball championship tournament for the Great Northwest Athletic Conference. The tournament has been held annually since 2011. It is a single-elimination tournament and seeding is based on regular season records.

The winner receives the conference's automatic bid to the NCAA Women's Division II Basketball Championship.

Results

Championship records

 Alaska and Western Oregon have not yet qualified for the finals of the tournament
 Concordia (OR) never qualified for the tournament finals as a GNAC member

See also
 Great Northwest Athletic Conference men's basketball tournament

References

NCAA Division II women's basketball conference tournaments
Recurring sporting events established in 2011